Thomas Louis Spence (April 17, 1896 – November 27, 1918) was an American college football player. Spence also played on the baseball, basketball, and track teams.

Georgia Tech

Football
Spence was a prominent fullback for John Heisman's Georgia Tech Golden Tornado of the Georgia Institute of Technology from 1914 to 1916 .  He was posthumously elected to the Georgia Tech Athletics Hall of Fame in 1976.

1915
In 1915, near the end of the LSU game, he returned an interception 85 yards. He made a 40-yard drop kick field goal against North Carolina.

1916
Spence was a starter for the 1916 team which, as one writer wrote, "seemed to personify Heisman." In Georgia Tech's record-setting 222-0 win over Cumberland College in 1916, Spence scored the second-most behind Everett Strupper when he netted five touchdowns. He was selected All-Southern that season. Walter Camp gave him honorable mention.

World War I
Spence was a casualty of the World War I. He is the namesake of Spence Air Base.

References

External links
 

1896 births
1918 deaths
Georgia Tech Yellow Jackets football players
American football fullbacks
All-Southern college football players
American military personnel killed in World War I
Baseball outfielders
Forwards (basketball)
People from Thomasville, Georgia
Players of American football from Georgia (U.S. state)
American football drop kickers